The French Armed Forces encompass the Army, the Navy, the Air and Space Force and the Gendarmerie of the French Republic. The President of France heads the armed forces as Chief of the Armed Forces.

France has the sixth largest defence budget in the world and the first in the European Union (EU). It has the largest armed forces in size in the European Union. According to Credit Suisse, the French Armed Forces are ranked as the world's sixth-most powerful military.

History

The military history of France encompasses an immense panorama of conflicts and struggles extending for more than 2,000 years across areas, including modern France, greater Europe, and French territorial possessions overseas. According to British historian Niall Ferguson, the French participated in 50 of the 125 major European wars that have been fought since 1495; more than any other European state. They are followed by the Austrians who fought in 47 of them, the Spanish in 44 and the English (and later British) who were involved in 43. In addition, out of all recorded conflicts which occurred since the year 387 BC, France has fought in 168 of them, won 109, lost 49 and drawn 10.

The Gallo-Roman conflict predominated from 60 BC to 50 BC, with the Romans emerging victorious in the conquest of Gaul by Julius Caesar. After the decline of the Roman Empire, a Germanic tribe known as the Franks took control of Gaul by defeating competing tribes. The "land of Francia," from which France gets its name, had high points of expansion under kings Clovis I and Charlemagne. In the Middle Ages, rivalries with England and the Holy Roman Empire prompted major conflicts such as the Norman Conquest and the Hundred Years' War. With an increasingly centralized monarchy, the first standing army since Roman times, and the use of artillery, France expelled the English from its territory and came out of the Middle Ages as the most powerful nation in Europe, only to lose that status to Spain following defeat in the Italian Wars. The Wars of Religion crippled France in the late 16th century, but a major victory over Spain in the Thirty Years' War made France the most powerful nation on the continent once more. In parallel, France developed its first colonial empire in Asia, Africa, and in the Americas. Under Louis XIV, France achieved military supremacy over its rivals, but escalating conflicts against increasingly powerful enemy coalitions checked French ambitions and left the kingdom bankrupt at the opening of the 18th century.

Resurgent French armies secured victories in dynastic conflicts against the Spanish, Polish, and Austrian crowns. At the same time, France was fending off attacks on its colonies. As the 18th century advanced, global competition with Great Britain led to the Seven Years' War, where France lost its North American holdings. Consolation came in the form of dominance in Europe and the American Revolutionary War, where extensive French aid in the form of money and arms, and the direct participation of its army and navy led to America's independence. Internal political upheaval eventually led to 23 years of nearly continuous conflict in the French Revolutionary Wars and the Napoleonic Wars. France reached the zenith of its power during this period, dominating the European continent in an unprecedented fashion under Napoleon Bonaparte, but by 1815 it had been restored to its pre-Revolutionary borders. The rest of the 19th century witnessed the growth of the Second French colonial empire as well as French interventions in Belgium, Spain, and Mexico. Other major wars were fought against Russia in the Crimea, Austria in Italy, and Prussia within France itself.

Following defeat in the Franco-Prussian War, Franco-German rivalry erupted again in the First World War. France and its allies were victorious this time. Social, political, and economic upheaval in the wake of the conflict led to the Second World War, in which the Allies were defeated in the Battle of France and the French government surrendered and was replaced with an authoritarian regime. The Allies, including the government in exile's Free French Forces and later a liberated French nation, eventually emerged victorious over the Axis powers. As a result, France secured an occupation zone in Germany and a permanent seat on the United Nations Security Council.

The imperative of avoiding a third Franco-German conflict on the scale of those of two world wars paved the way for European integration starting in the 1950s. France became a nuclear power with its first test of an atomic bomb in Algeria in 1960 Since the 1990s its military action is most often seen in cooperation with NATO and its European partners.

International stance

Today, French military doctrine is based on the concepts of national independence, nuclear deterrence (see Force de frappe), and military self-sufficiency. France is a charter member of NATO, and has worked actively with its allies to adapt NATO—internally and externally—to the post-Cold War environment. In December 1995, France announced that it would increase its participation in NATO's military wing, including the Military Committee (France withdrew from NATO's military bodies in 1966 whilst remaining full participants in the Organisation's political Councils). France remains a firm supporter of the Organization for Security and Co-operation in Europe and other cooperative efforts. Paris hosted the May 1997 NATO-Russia Summit which sought the signing of the Founding Act on Mutual Relations, Cooperation and Security. Outside of NATO, France has actively and heavily participated in both coalition and unilateral peacekeeping efforts in Africa, the Middle East, and the Balkans, frequently taking a lead role in these operations. France has undertaken a major restructuring to develop a professional military that will be smaller, more rapidly deployable, and better tailored for operations outside of mainland France. Key elements of the restructuring include: reducing personnel, bases and headquarters, and rationalisation of equipment and the armaments industry.

Since the end of the Cold War, France has placed a high priority on arms control and non-proliferation. French Nuclear testing in the Pacific, and the sinking of the Rainbow Warrior strained French relations with its Allies, South Pacific states (namely New Zealand), and world opinion. France agreed to the Nuclear Non-Proliferation Treaty in 1992 and supported its indefinite extension in 1995. After conducting a controversial final series of six nuclear tests on Mururoa in the South Pacific, the French signed the Comprehensive Test Ban Treaty in 1996. Since then, France has implemented a moratorium on the production, export, and use of anti-personnel landmines and supports negotiations leading toward a universal ban. The French are key players in the adaptation of the Treaty on Conventional Armed Forces in Europe to the new strategic environment. France remains an active participant in: the major programs to restrict the transfer of technologies that could lead to the proliferation of weapons of mass destruction: the Nuclear Suppliers Group, the Australia Group (for chemical and biological weapons), and the Missile Technology Control Regime. France has also signed and ratified the Chemical Weapons Convention.

White Papers

2008
On 31 July 2007, President Nicolas Sarkozy ordered M. Jean-Claude Mallet, a member of the Council of State, to head up a thirty-five member commission charged with a wide-ranging review of French defence. The commission issued its White Paper in early 2008. Acting upon its recommendations, President Sarkozy began making radical changes in French defense policy and structures starting in the summer of 2008. In keeping with post-Cold War changes in European politics and power structures, the French military's traditional focus on territorial defence will be redirected to meet the challenges of a global threat environment. Under the reorganisation, the identification and destruction of terrorist networks both in metropolitan France and in francophone Africa will be the primary task of the French military. Redundant military bases will be closed and new weapons systems projects put on hold to finance the restructuring and global deployment of intervention forces. In a historic change, Sarkozy furthermore has declared that France "will now participate fully in NATO," four decades after former French president General Charles de Gaulle withdrew from the alliance's command structure and ordered American troops off French soil.

2013

In May 2014, high ranking defence chiefs of the French Armed Forces threatened to resign if the defence budget received further cuts on top of those already announced in the 2013 White Paper. They warned that further cuts would leave the armed forces unable to support operations abroad.

Recent operations

There are currently 36,000 French troops deployed in foreign territories—such operations are known as "OPEX" for Opérations Extérieures ("External Operations"). Among other countries, France provides troops for the United Nations force stationed in Haiti following the 2004 Haiti rebellion. France has sent troops, especially special forces, into Afghanistan to help the United States and NATO forces fight the remains of the Taliban and Al Qaeda. In Opération Licorne a force of a few thousand French soldiers is stationed in Ivory Coast on a UN peacekeeping mission. These troops were initially sent under the terms of a mutual protection pact between France and the Ivory Coast, but the mission has since evolved into the current UN peacekeeping operation. The French Armed Forces have also played a leading role in the ongoing UN peacekeeping mission along the Lebanon-Israel border as part of the cease-fire agreement that brought the 2006 Lebanon War to an end. Currently, France has 2,000 army personnel deployed along the border, including infantry, armour, artillery and air defence. There are also naval and air personnel deployed offshore.

The French Joint Force and Training Headquarters (État-Major Interarmées de Force et d'Entraînement) at Air Base 110 near Creil maintains the ability to command a medium or large-scale international operation, and runs exercises . In 2011, from 19 March, France participated in the enforcement of a no-fly zone over northern Libya, during the Libyan Civil war, in order to prevent forces loyal to Muammar Gaddafi from carrying out air attacks on Anti-Gaddafi forces. This operation was known as Opération Harmattan and was part of France's involvement in the conflict in the NATO-led coalition, enforcing UN Security Council Resolution 1973. On 11 January 2013 France begun Operation Serval to fight Islamists in Mali and the Sahal Region with African support but without NATO involvement and launched Operation Barkhane to combat terror in African Sahal from 2014 to 2022.

Exercises
France participates in several recurring exercises with other nations,  including:

 Caraibe 2013, every two years in the Caribbean, centering on Martinique and Guadeloupe.
 Croix du Sud, in New Caledonia every two years with Australia, New Zealand, the United States and other Pacific nations.
 Varuna, an annual naval exercise with India.
In 2023, Exercise Orion, the largest in decades, is to be held in the Champagne-Ardenne region. About 10,000 soldiers are expected to take part, along with the French navy and possibly forces from Belgium, Britain, and the United States.

Personnel
The head of the French armed forces is the President of the Republic, in his role as chef des armées. However, the Constitution puts civil and military government forces at the disposal of the gouvernement (the executive cabinet of ministers chaired by the Prime Minister, who are not necessarily of the same political side as the president). The Minister of the Armed Forces (as of 2022, the incumbent Sébastien Lecornu) oversees the military's funding, procurement and operations. Historically, France relied a great deal on conscription to provide manpower for its military, in addition to a minority of professional career soldiers. Following the Algerian War, the use of non-volunteer draftees in foreign operations was ended; if their unit was called up for duty in war zones, draftees were offered the choice between requesting a transfer to another unit or volunteering for the active mission. In 1996, President Jacques Chirac's government announced the end of conscription and in 2001, conscription formally was ended. Young people must still, however, register for possible conscription (should the situation call for it). As of 2017 the French Armed Forces have total manpower of 426,265, and has an active personnel of 368,962 (with the Gendarmerie Nationale).

It breaks down as follows (2022):
 The French Army; 118,600 personnel.
 The French Air and Space Force; 43,597 personnel.
 The French Navy; 36,044 personnel.
 Tri-service DHS, SEO, and DGA; 17,647 personnel in medical, support and administrative roles, and in the acquisition of weapon systems.

The reserve element of the French Armed Forces consists of two structures; the Operational Reserve and the Citizens Reserve. As of 2022 the strength of the Operational Reserve is 25,785 personnel.

Apart from the three main service branches, the French Armed Forces also includes a fourth military branch called the National Gendarmerie. It had a reported strength of 103,000 active personnel and 25,000 reserve personnel in 2018. They are used in everyday law enforcement, and also form a coast guard formation under the command of the French Navy. There are however some elements of the Gendarmerie that participate in French external operations, providing specialised law enforcement and supporting roles.

Historically the National Guard functioned as the Army's reserve national defense and law enforcement militia. After 145 years since its disbandment, due to the risk of terrorist attacks in the country, the Guard was officially reactivated, this time as a service branch of the Armed Forces, on 12 October 2016.

Since 2019 young French citizens can fulfill the mandatory service Service national universel (SNU) within the Armed Forces in the service branch of their choice.

Organisation and service branches
Placed under the command of the staffs, the French armed forces include the four service branches, the Army, the National Navy, the Air and Space Force and the National Gendarmerie, as well as the support services and joint organizations:

French Army (Armée de terre)

 Special Forces
 Airborne Units (Troupes aéroportées)
 Infantry (Infanterie)
 Armoured Cavalry (Arme blindée cavalerie)
 Artillery (Artillerie)
 Foreign Legion (Légion étrangère)
 Troupes de Marine
 French Army Light Aviation (Aviation légére de l'armée de terre, ALAT)
 Engineers (Génie)
 Paris Fire Brigade (brigade des sapeurs-pompiers de Paris)
 Signal Corps (Transmissions)
 Transport and logistics (Train)
 Matériel (Supply)
 Intelligence (Renseignement)

National Navy (Marine nationale)

 Parachute Units of the French Navy
 Naval Infantry and Naval Commandos (Fusiliers Marins)
 Naval Air Arm (Aviation navale)
 Submarine Force (Forces sous-marines)
 Naval Action Force (Force d'action navale)
 The Marseille Marine Fire Battalion

In addition, the National Gendarmerie form a Coast Guard force called the Gendarmerie Maritime which is commanded by the French Navy.

French Air and Space Force (Armée de l'Air et de l'Espace)

 French Space Command
 Parachute Units of the French Air and Space Force
 Air and space force ground troops (Fusiliers Commandos de l'Air)
 Paratroopers/Special forces (Commando parachutiste de l'air)
 Territorial Air Defence

National Gendarmerie (Gendarmerie nationale)

 Parachute Units of the National Gendarmerie
 Gendarmerie Départementale (GD) – territorial police force
 Gendarmerie Mobile (GM) – anti-riot unit and counter-terrorism group (GIGN)
 Garde républicaine – republican guard of France
 Gendarmerie des Transports Aériens – airport security force
 Gendarmerie de l'Air – used for Air and Space Force security
 Gendarmerie Maritime – coast guard unit
 Provost Gendarmerie – provides military police services to French Armed Forces personnel in deployments outside France
 Overseas Gendamerie - provides military police services in the French overseas dependencies and territories, as well as to embassies of France abroad

The National Gendarmerie is primarily a military and airborne capable police force which serves as a rural and general purpose police force.

National Guard (Garde nationale)

Reactivated in 2016, the National Guard serves as the official primary military and police reserve service of the Armed Forces. It is placed under the jurisdiction of Ministry of the Armed Forces and serves as a reserve force. It also doubles as a force multiplier for law enforcement personnel during contingencies and to reinforce military personnel whenever being deployed within France and abroad.

Gallery

See also

 Bastille Day Military Parade
 Combined Joint Expeditionary Force (CJEF)
 Foreign Legion
 Troupes de Marine
 Military history of France
 National Office for Veterans and Victims of War
 The Lancaster House Treaties (2010)
 List of equipment of the French Army

References

Bibliography

External links
 Official site of the French Ministry of Defence
 French Military Strategy and NATO Reintegration—Council on Foreign Relations
 French Army rank insignia

 03
1792 establishments in France
Permanent Structured Cooperation